
Year 332 BC was a year of the pre-Julian Roman calendar. At the time, it was known as the Year of the Consulship of Calvinus and Arvina (or, less frequently, year 422 Ab urbe condita). The denomination 332 BC for this year has been used since the early medieval period, when the Anno Domini calendar era became the prevalent method in Europe for naming years.

Events 
 By place 
 Persian Empire 
 The Persian King Darius III twice sends on horseback to Alexander letters of friendship. The second time he offers a large ransom for his family, the ceding of all of the Persian Empire west of the Euphrates River, and the hand of his daughter in return for an alliance. Alexander rejects both letters and marches into Mesopotamia.
At the acropolis in Susa, an unidentified woman is buried in a bronze sarcophagus, wearing "a mass of finely-wrought and artistic gems and jewels" and two coins, one dating from 350 BC and the other from 332 BC.  The tomb will remain unopened for more than 22 centuries, until French archaeologist Jacques de Morgan unearths it on February 10, 1901.

 Macedonia 
 Alexander the Great occupies Damascus and, after a siege lasting seven months, destroys Tyre during which there is great carnage and the sale of the women and children into slavery.
 Leaving Parmenion in Syria, Alexander advances south without opposition until he reaches Gaza where bitter resistance halts him for two months, and he sustains a serious shoulder wound during a sortie.
 Alexander conquers Egypt from the Persians. The Egyptians welcome him as their deliverer, and the Persian satrap Mazaces wisely surrenders. Alexander's conquest of Egypt completes his control of the whole eastern Mediterranean coast.
 November 14 – Alexander is crowned as pharaoh of Upper and Lower Egypt – god and king all at once – son of Ra and Osiris, Horus the "Golden One" and beloved of Amun. 
 Alexander spends the winter organizing the administration of Egypt. He employs Egyptian governors, while keeping the army under a separate Macedonian command.
 Alexander founds the city of Alexandria near the western arm of the Nile on a site between the sea and Lake Mareotis, protected by the island of Pharos, and has the city laid out by the Rhodian architect Deinocrates.

 Italy 
 After a victory over the Samnites and Lucanians near Paestum, Alexander of Epirus makes a treaty with the Romans.

Births

Deaths

References